Aguenar – Hadj Bey Akhamok Airport , also known as Aguenar Airport or Tamanrasset Airport, is an airport serving Tamanrasset, a city in the Tamanrasset Province of southern Algeria.

Airlines and destinations

Military and government use
The Algerian Air Force is the primary military user of the airport with several units maintaining a presence at the field.  In the mid-2000s it was extensively upgraded to serve additionally as a military base, with 10 hardened aircraft shelters, aprons, personnel accommodation and other facilities.  The most potent military aircraft based at Tamanrasset are the Sukhoi Su-30MK multi-role fighter aircraft operated by the 123rd Air Defense Squadron which provide fighter coverage for much of southern Algeria from the base.  A reconnaissance unit equipped with Beechcraft 1900HISAR and 350ER aircraft specially equipped with surveillance equipment operates from the base along with helicopter detachments operating Mil Mi-171Sh, Mi-24 Mk.III and Mi-26T2 helicopters to support the ground forces in the region.

The airport was an alternative landing site for NASA's Space Shuttle, and has been used for American military operations.

Statistics

Incidents and accidents
On 8 February 1978, Douglas C-49J N189UM of Aero Service Corporation was damaged beyond repair in a landing accident at Tamanrasset.
On 18 September 1994, an Oriental Airlines charter plane returning Nigerian football team Iwuanyanwu Nationale FC home from their CAF Cup quarterfinal football match against Esperance de Tunis crashed while landing at the airport, killing three crew and two passengers, defender Aimola Omale and goalkeeper Uche Ikeogu.
On 6 March 2003 Air Algérie Flight 6289 crashed at 3:45 pm local time (1445 GMT). The flight was leaving Tamanrasset bound for Algiers with the co-pilot acting as pilot-in-command. At a height of 78 feet and a speed of 158 kts, the No. 1 engine suffered a turbine failure. The captain took control. The co-pilot asked if she should raise the gear, but the captain did not respond. The Boeing 737-200 lost speed, stalled, and broke up on rocky terrain about 1600 metres past the runway. The accident was caused by the loss of an engine during a critical phase of flight, the non-retraction of the landing gear after the engine failure, and the Captain taking over control of the airplane before having clearly identified the problem. There were 102 fatalities and one survivor.

References

External links

 Google Maps - Tamanrasset
 "Algeria plane crash kills 102" at CNN.com (Archive)
Official accident report from the Algerian Ministry of Transport (in English) (Archive)
 
 

Airports in Algeria
Buildings and structures in Tamanrasset Province
Space Shuttle Emergency Landing Sites